Turbo gruneri, common name the Gruner's turban, is a species of sea snail, marine gastropod mollusk in the family Turbinidae.

Description
The length of the shell varies between 18 mm and 45 mm. The orbicular, imperforate shell is conoid with an acute apex. It is of pale flesh-color, maculated with bright rufous. The convex whorls are spirally sculptured with granulose lirae. The aperture is circular. The wide columella is callous, slightly dilated and bounded outside by a spiral funicle.

Distribution
This marine species occurs in South and West Australia, and off Tasmania.

References

 Philippi R.A. 1846. Diagnoses testaceorum quorundam novorum. Zeitschrift für Malakozoologie, 1846(7): 97–106
 Verco, J.C. 1908. Notes on South Australian marine Mollusca with descriptions of new species. Part IX. Transactions of the Royal Society of South Australia 32: 338–361
 Cotton, B.C. 1959. South Australian Mollusca. Archaeogastropoda. Handbook of the Flora and Fauna of South Australia. Adelaide : South Australian Government Printer 449 pp.
 Wilson, B. 1993. Australian Marine Shells. Prosobranch Gastropods. Kallaroo, Western Australia : Odyssey Publishing Vol. 1 408 pp

External links
 

gruneri
Gastropods of Australia
Gastropods described in 1846
Taxa named by Rodolfo Amando Philippi